Stocker may refer to:

Surname
 Achim Stocker (1935–2009), German football chairman 
 Blanche Stocker (1884–1950), British actress and singer
 Doris Stocker (1886–1968), British actress and singer
 John Stocker (voice actor) (1948–), Canadian voice actor
 John Stocker (scientist) (1945–), Australian scientist
 Kevin Stocker (1970–), American baseball player
 Mel Stocker (1980–), American baseball player
 Valentin Stocker (1989–), Swiss soccer player
 Wally Stocker (1954–), English rock guitarist
 Werner Stocker (actor) (1955–1993), German actor

Other
 Stocker (video game), 1984 arcade video game released by Bally
 A person who performs shelf stocking, that is, stocks shelves in a retail store or warehouse; see stock management
 Livestock fed for a short time and then sold (for example, in cattle farming, stockers are contrasted with feeders)
 A racecar in certain classes of auto racing whose origins are nominally or notionally related to factory-stock autos, such as stock car racing or super-stock drag racing

See also
 Stöcker
 Stock (disambiguation)

German-language surnames